Also known as the TJCCAA and Region 7, the Tennessee Junior and Community College Athletic Conference, commonly referred to as the Tennessee Community College Athletic Association (TCCAA) and a member of the National Junior College Athletic Association (NJCAA), is a junior college athletic conference for technological and community colleges in Tennessee and Kentucky. Conference championships are held in most sports and individuals can be named to All-Conference and All-Academic teams.

Member schools

Current members
The TJCCAC currently has 11 full members, all are public schools:

Notes

Former members
The TJCCAC had six former full members, all were private schools:

Notes

See also
 National Junior College Athletic Association (NJCAA)

External links
Official Website
NJCAA Website

NJCAA conferences
College sports in Tennessee